Better Days Comin is the sixth studio album by American rock band Winger. It was released on April 23, 2014, debuting at #21 on the Top Current Rock Albums Chart and #85 on the Billboard 200.

Track listing

Personnel
Winger
Kip Winger – lead vocals, bass, acoustic guitar, keyboards
Reb Beach – co-lead guitar, background vocals
Rod Morgenstein – drums
John Roth – co-lead guitar, background vocals

Additional musicians
Cenk Eroglu – keyboards, sound effects
Marco Giovino – percussion
Paula Winger – vocals

Production
Kip Winger – producer & mixing
Paul Blakemore	– mastering
Jason Green – video production
Dave Hoffis – assistant engineer
Dan Hubp – video production
Pride Smith – artwork
Deeandra Swabb – administration
Andres Martinez – photograph
Denise Truscello – band photographer
Chris Corey – band photographer

References

2014 albums
Winger (band) albums
Frontiers Records albums
Albums produced by Kip Winger